The Eleventh Commandment is a 1924 British crime film directed by George A. Cooper and starring Fay Compton, Stewart Rome and Lillian Hall-Davis. It is based on the play The Eleventh Commandment by Brandon Fleming.

Plot
An actress tries to rescue her sister from the clutches of a blackmailer.

Cast
 Fay Compton as Ruth Barchester 
 Stewart Rome as John Lynton 
 Lillian Hall-Davis as Marian Barchester 
 Charles Quatermaine as James Mountford 
 Jack Hobbs as Robert Ransome 
 Dawson Millward as Sir Noel Barchester 
 Louise Hampton as  Lady Barchester 
 Brian Aherne as Norman Barchester

References

External links

1924 films
1924 crime films
1920s English-language films
British films based on plays
Films directed by George A. Cooper
British silent feature films
British black-and-white films
British crime films
Films shot at Lime Grove Studios
Films set in London
1920s British films